Murray Central station is a light rail and commuter rail station in Murray, Utah, United States served by the Blue Line and Red Line of Utah Transit Authority's (UTA) TRAX light rail system that operates in Salt Lake County and by the FrontRunner, UTA's commuter rail train that operates along the Wasatch Front with service from Ogden in central Weber County through Davis County, Salt Lake City, and Salt Lake County to Provo in central Utah County. The FrontRunner portion of the station is part of the FrontRunner South extension. The Blue Line provides service from Downtown Salt Lake City south to Draper. The Red Line provides service from the University of Utah to the Daybreak Community of South Jordan. The station is situated immediately west of the Intermountain Medical Center complex.

Description 
The TRAX portion of the station is located at 5144 Cottonwood Street and is accessed from either East Vine Street on the north or West 5300 South (SR-173/Spartan Street) at 100 West.  The FrontRunner portion of the station is located at 140 East Vine Street. However, both TRAX and the FrontRunner platforms can be accessed from either parking lot. To the east of the station is the Intermountain Medical Center, with its large parking lot. Between the two free Park and Ride lots, there are nearly 1,100 parking spaces available. The adjacent Intermoutain Medical Center was built on the site of the former Murray Smelter. The Murray Downtown Historic District is across Little Cottonwood Creek to the northeast. The station is located within the Quiet Zone, so trains do not routinely sound their horns when approaching public crossings within this corridor. The TRAX portion of the station opened on December 4, 1999 and the FrontRunner portion opened, along with the rest of the FrontRunner South, on December 10, 2012.

References 

Railway stations in the United States opened in 2008
Railway stations in the United States opened in 2012
Railway stations in Salt Lake County, Utah
TRAX (light rail) stations
1999 establishments in Utah